Circus of Love is a 1954 drama film directed by Kurt Neumann and starring Eva Bartok, Curd Jürgens and Bernhard Wicki. It was made as a co-production between West Germany and the United States. It premiered at the Berlin International Film Festival.

The film was shot at the Bavaria Studios in Munich and on location in the city. The film's sets were designed by the art directors Hans Kuhnert and Theo Zwierski. It was produced by King Brothers and released in West Germany by RKO Pictures. A separate English-language version Carnival Story was shot simultaneously.

Cast
 Eva Bartok as Lilli
 Curd Jürgens as Toni
 Bernhard Wicki as Franz
 Robert Freitag as Richard
 Willi Rose as Karl
 Ady Berber as Groppo the Wildman
 Helene Stanley as 	Lore
 Jacob Möslacher as 	The Dwarf
 Josef Schneider as 	The Sword-swallower
 Amalie Lindinger as 	The Fat Lady
 Ly Maria as 	The Snake Lady
 Anni Trautner as 	The Bearded Lady
 Jadin Wong as The Chinese Dancer

References

Bibliography
 Hayes, R.M. 3-D Movies: A History and Filmography of Stereoscopic Cinema. McFarland, 1998.

External links

1954 films
1954 drama films
German drama films
West German films
Circus films
Films directed by Kurt Neumann
German multilingual films
1950s multilingual films
RKO Pictures films
Films shot at Bavaria Studios
1950s German films
1950s German-language films